Federico Jordán-Gómez (born April 2, 1969 in Torreón, Coahuila) is a visual artist. His work has been published in Forbes, Harvard Business Review, The New Yorker and The Wall Street Journal among others.

He received formal training from the Academy of San Carlos in Mexico City and completed his graduate studies from  Autonomous University of Nuevo León in  Monterrey, Nuevo León, Mexico. He is currently a professor in the faculty of Visual Arts at the Autonomous University of Nuevo León  and lives in Saltillo, México.

References

External links
Official website
Interview by Nate Williams

1969 births
Living people
Mexican artists
Academic staff of the Autonomous University of Nuevo León